The Lake Creek Bridge also known as the Nelson Mountain Bridge, near Greenleaf, in the U.S. state of Oregon, is listed on the National Register of Historic Places. The  covered bridge, built in 1928, carries Nelson Mountain Road over Lake Creek in Lane County.

Notable features of the bridge include upper and lower truss chords made of one-piece old-growth timbers, narrow ribbon windows at the eaves, and portals that are truncated rectangular arches. A renovation in 1984 added new reinforced concrete abutments, new flooring, and other alterations to increase the bridge's load capacity.

See also
 List of bridges on the National Register of Historic Places in Oregon
 National Register of Historic Places listings in Lane County, Oregon

References

External links

National Register of Historic Places in Lane County, Oregon
Covered bridges on the National Register of Historic Places in Oregon
Covered bridges in Lane County, Oregon
Road bridges on the National Register of Historic Places in Oregon
Wooden bridges in Oregon
Howe truss bridges in the United States